Julius Efosa Aghahowa (born 12 February 1982) is a Nigerian former professional footballer who played as a striker. He was known for his pace and his back-flips when he scored goals. Aghahowa became the first foreign national outside the former Soviet Union, who was among the best scorers in the Ukrainian Premier League 2000–01 season.

Aghahowa played in Ukraine, England and Turkey during his career. Famous for his acrobatic goal celebrations, he performed six consecutive perfect backflips after scoring a goal against Sweden at the 2002 FIFA World Cup.

Club career

Early career
Born in Benin City, Aghahowa began his career with the Police Machines, a local police team, and went on to Bendel Insurance. He signed for Danish lower division team Herning Fremad before the 1999 African Youth Championship, but Aghahowa performed so well there that he wanted to play for a bigger club. He ended up with the Tunisian champions, Espérance, when he procured a contract with the Tunisians which predated the Herning Fremad contract.

Shakhtar Donetsk
In the middle of the 2000–01 season, Aghahowa transferred to Shakhtar Donetsk, who soon won the Ukrainian league championship. Aghahowa won the game for Shakhtar in the 2006 Ukrainian Championship against Dynamo Kyiv, heading the winner in extra-time and being named man of the match. His performance in the final has been widely seen as the "saving grace" of his career at Shakhtar, with his future at the club looking bleak earlier in the season. After playing over six years for Shakhtar Donetsk, Aghahowa left for Wigan Athletic.

Wigan Athletic
His work permit was passed and on 30 January 2007, he signed for Wigan Athletic for an undisclosed fee, playing his first Premiership match for them against Portsmouth on 3 February. Aghahowa did not score for Wigan in one and half years and on 20 June 2008, he signed for Kayserispor.

Return to Shakhtar Donetsk
On 4 July 2009, Shakhtar Donetsk signed Aghahowa on a free transfer after he was released by Kayserispor. He had already played for Shakhtar from 2000 to 2007 and declared a great desire to play for his old club. However, he could not find himself as a regular starter and was loaned out to PFC Sevastopol at the beginning of the 2010–11 season. He was released at the end of the 2011–12 season, announcing his retirement from the game in April 2013.

International career
Aghahowa played 32 matches and scored 14 goals for the Nigeria national team, including their only goal at the 2002 World Cup against Sweden. He became Nigeria's top goalscorer at the 2002 African Nations Cup. He also played at the 2000 Summer Olympics.

Career statistics

Club

International

Honours
Espérance
 Tunisian Ligue Professionnelle 1: 2000

Shakhtar Donetsk
 Ukrainian Premier League: 2002, 2005, 2006, 2010
 Ukrainian Cup: 2002, 2004

References

External links

Nigerian Players

Time for Aghahowa to stop blowing hot and cold
 

Living people
1982 births
Sportspeople from Benin City
Association football forwards
Nigerian footballers
Nigeria international footballers
Nigeria under-20 international footballers
Bendel Insurance F.C. players
Espérance Sportive de Tunis players
FC Shakhtar Donetsk players
FC Shakhtar-2 Donetsk players
Wigan Athletic F.C. players
Kayserispor footballers
FC Sevastopol players
Ukrainian Premier League players
Ukrainian First League players
Premier League players
Süper Lig players
Nigerian expatriate footballers
Expatriate footballers in Tunisia
Expatriate footballers in Ukraine
Expatriate footballers in England
Expatriate footballers in Turkey
Nigerian expatriate sportspeople in Ukraine
Olympic footballers of Nigeria
Footballers at the 2000 Summer Olympics
2002 FIFA World Cup players
2000 African Cup of Nations players
2002 African Cup of Nations players
2004 African Cup of Nations players
2006 Africa Cup of Nations players